The 2021–22 Iranian Futsal Super League is the 23rd season of the Iran Pro League and the 18th under the name Futsal Super League. Mes Sungun are the defending champions. The season will feature 12 teams from the 2020–21 Super League and two new teams promoted from the 2020–21 Iran Futsal's 1st Division.

Format changes 
After the schedule problems caused by COVID-19 pandemic in Iran made some forced major changes in competition format of last season, it returned to its usual one-group round-robin format.

Teams

Stadiums and locations

Personnel

Number of teams by region

League table 

</noinclude><noinclude>

Results

Positions by round

Clubs season-progress

Awards 

 Winner: Giti Pasand
 Runners-up: Mes Sungun
 Third-Place: Crop
 Top scorer: Saeid Ahmadabbasi (Giti Pasand) (41 goals)
 Best Player: 
 Best Manager: 
 Best Goalkeeper: 
 Best Team: 
 Fairplay Man: 
 Best Referee:

References 

Iranian Futsal Super League seasons
1